The Madden Dam, completed in 1935, impounds the Chagres River in Panama to form Lake Alajuela, a reservoir that is an essential part of the Panama Canal watershed. It can store one third of the canal's annual water requirements for the operation of the locks. Since the reservoir is not part of the navigational route, there are fewer restrictions on its water level.

The Madden Dam was built to prevent the occasionally torrential flow of the once wild Chagres River, which flows into the navigational route of Gatun Lake and to control the level of water in the lake during the dry season.  The river's unruly flow posed a major challenge to the construction of the Panama Canal which was originally addressed by the construction of the Gatun Dam.  Water from the dam's reservoir is also used to generate hydroelectric power and to supply Panama City's fresh water.  The dam and the reservoir behind it were both named for U.S. Congressman Martin B. Madden of Illinois, who was a chairman of the House appropriations committee during the period while the U.S. was constructing the Panama Canal. The reservoir, which had been known as Madden Lake from the time the dam first became operational, was renamed Lake Alajuela after the Canal Zone reverted to Panamanian control at the end of 1999.

See also

 List of power stations in Panama

References

Dams completed in 1935
Energy infrastructure completed in 1935
Panama Canal
Dams in Panama
Hydroelectric power stations in Panama
1935 establishments in Panama